St. Stephen's Church is located on Church Mission Road in Delhi. The church was built in 1862, by Anglican missionaries and DPW Engineers in the style of Italian Gothic architecture. It is part of Church of North India Diocese of Delhi.
The St. Stephen's Church, Delhi compound also has the famous St. Stephen's College and St Stephen's Hospital, Delhi.

Architecture
The Church is typical Gothic style architecture, the Church is highly influenced by the Romanesque architecture Apart from its ornate walls and ceilings the Church has a unique feature which is the stained glass rose window which is exclusive in Delhi. The baroque styled church has arched windows which allow the sunlight to brighten the interiors. the interiors are well maintained with motifs, pictures, carvings and beautiful furniture. A series of fine plasters form arcade on either side with lined columns made of sandstone. These columns have beautiful carvings.

History

The organization responsible for the building of St. Stephen's Church was the Anglican mission Society for the Propagation of the Gospel. Much of the work of the Society for the Propagation of the Gospel in India was later supported by the Cambridge Mission to Delhi.  The Cambridge Mission was instrumental in the founding of St. Stephen's College, Delhi now a constituent part of Delhi University. The color of the Church is said to symbolize the blood of St. Stephen, the first Christian Martyr and patron saint of the city, and also the blood of the first Christian martyrs in India who were killed in Delhi in 1857 revolt.

The St. Stephen's Church, Delhi compound also has the famous St. Stephen's College and St Stephen's Hospital.

St. Stephen's Hospital, Delhi

St Stephen's Hospital, Delhi is the oldest and one of the largest private Hospitals in Delhi. Established in 1885, it has a capacity of about 600 beds, and is a super speciality tertiary care Hospital offering care in all Specialties and most super specialties. Apart from treating patients, the Hospital is running training programmes in various Specialty and Super specialty courses affiliated to the National Board of Examinations and recognized by the Medical Council of India. In addition, many young aspirants are trained each year in General Nursing and Midwifery and in Allied health professional Courses. B.Sc. Nursing has been recently introduced.

Academics
The courses offered by the institute are:

 M.B.B.S. (Annual intake of 77 students)
 BSc (Hons.) in Nursing (Annual intake of 70 students in BSc Nursing)
 Bachelor of Physiotherapy
 Post Graduate Diploma in Dietetics
 Diploma in Pharmacy
 Diploma in Radiodiagnosis Technology
 Diploma in Medical Laboratory Technology
 Diploma in Ophthalmic Technology
 Diploma in Anaesthesia Technology
 Diploma in Medical Record Technology
 Diploma in Electrophysiology and Pulmonology Technology
 Diploma in Dialysis Technology
 Diploma in Diabetic Education & Podiatry Technology

Medical Facilities
 General OPD
 Private OPD
 Free OPD
 Anesthesia
 Cardio-Thoracic Surgery
 Cardiology
 Casualty
 Community Health
 Dental
 Dermatology
 E.N.T
 Endocrinology
 Gastroenterology
 Hepatobilary Pancreatic and Liver Transplant
 Histo Pathology
 Laboratory Services
 Medicine
 Nephrology
 Neurology
 Neurosurgery
 Obstetrics & Gynaecology 
 Oncology
 Ophthalmology
 Orthopaedics
 Paediatrics
 Paediatrics Surgery
 Plastic Surgery
 Psychiatry
 Radiology
 Reproductive and Foetal Medicine (RFM)
 Respiratory Pulmonary Medicine
 Surgery 
 Surgical I.C.U.
 Urology

Other Christian Medical Colleges & Hospitals in Delhi
 Holy Family Hospital (New Delhi)

Churches in Delhi
 Central Baptist Church (Delhi)
 Cathedral Church of the Redemption
 Sacred Heart Cathedral, New Delhi
 St. James' Church, Delhi

References 

 Bauconm, Ian. Out of Place: Englishness, Empire, and the Locations of Identity. Princeton: Princeton University Press, 1999
 Morris, Jan, with Simon Winchester. Stones of Empire: The Buildings of the Raj. Oxford University Press, 2005

Church of North India church buildings
Churches in Delhi
1862 establishments in India